Gigi Wong Kai-yan (born 9 April 2005), commonly known as her stage name Gigi Yim Ming-hay, is a Hong Kong singer and actress, and a member of the Hong Kong girl group After Class. She is noted for winning TVB's reality talent competition  in 2021. Yim made her solo debut in September 2021 with the single "Noble Truth".

Early life
Yim was born Wong Kai-yan, in Hong Kong on 9 April 2005, being the eldest of three siblings. With both parents being Mainland Chinese, she grows up with her parental aunt and uncle in Hong Kong and attends . She has keened on singing since her childhood and is influenced by Chinese reality singing competition The Voice of China. As her uncle discovered her singing talent, he encouraged her to learn singing, making her start learning singing in a music academy, and participating different kinds of talent shows and competitions.

Music career
Yim became one of the contestants of TVB's reality talent competition Stars Academy in 2021, and her performance of Sandy Lam's "Without You, But Still Love You" (沒有你還是愛你, which itself is a Cantonese cover version of Beverley Craven's "Promise Me") in the competition gained her popularity.

After winning the competition, she debuted in September 2021 with the single "Noble Truth". She also released another single "Love is Beauty with a Flaw" (愛是帶種缺陷的美) collaborated with Hubert Wu in 2021.

In 2022, she released five other singles, namely "" (複雜), "" (一水兩方), "Most Concerned About" (最牽掛的), "" (焰) and "" (好想約你). She also participated in the reality singing competition  organised by TVB and Hunan Television. She was then awarded  by the single "Flame".

Acting career

Discography

Singles

As lead artist

Collaborations

Filmography

Television series

References

External links

 
 

2005 births
Living people
21st-century Hong Kong women singers
TVB actors